Geneva Area City School District is a public education school district located in Ashtabula County, Ohio. The district serves the city of Geneva and its surrounding townships and villages. As of 2005, roughly 2,300 students attend the five schools in the district.

District schools
Austinburg Elementary School
Cork Elementary School
Geneva High School
Geneva Junior High School
Platt R. Spencer School

Locations served
Austinburg Township
Geneva-on-the-Lake
Geneva
Geneva Township
Harpersfield Township
Trumbull Township

References

External links
 

Education in Ashtabula County, Ohio
School districts in Ohio